Earl of Arran is a title in the Peerage of Scotland.  It is not to be confused with the title Earl of Arran in the Peerage of Ireland. The two titles refer to different places: the Isle of Arran in Scotland, and the Aran Islands in Ireland. The Scottish earldom is a subsidiary title of the Duke of Hamilton, whereas the Irish earldom is a separate title held by the Gore family.

Scottish creations

Feudal Earldom of Arran

The feudal Earldom of Arran supposedly had its caput at Lochranza Castle. The arms of the feudal Earl of Arran are: Argent, a lymphad with the sails furled proper flagged gules. These are quartered today with the arms of Hamilton (Gules, three cinquefoils ermine) by the Duke of Hamilton. In a similar fashion the arms of the feudal Earldom of Orkney are quartered by the present Earl of Caithness,  the arms of the feudal Barony (or Earldom) of Lorne are now quartered by the Duke of Argyll, and the arms of the feudal Lord of the Isles are quartered with Clan Stewart by the Duke of Rothesay, all in the form of Lymphads.

In 1997 Willi Ernst Sturzenegger, a Swiss millionaire and owner of the ruined Lochranza Castle, petitioned the Lord Lyon King of Arms to be recognised officially "in the name, style and dignity of Willi Ernst Sturzenegger of Arran, Earl of Arran in the territorial baronage of Scotland", and for a Grant of Arms with additaments appropriate to him as "Earl of Arran in the territorial baronage of Scotland", on the basis that he had been "infeft" (i.e. enfeoffed) in 1995 in "ALL and WHOLE the Lands and Earldom of Arran in the County of Bute including inter alia the Castle of Lochranza the caput thereof …". In 2006 he further petitioned the Lord Lyon King of Arms for official recognition "in the name, style and dignity of Willi Ernst Sturzenegger of Arran, Feudal Earl of Arran" with appropriate heraldic additaments. This was denied by the Lord Lyon in his 2009 ruling.

Peerage title

The title was first created in the Peerage of Scotland in 1467 for Thomas Boyd, who was later attainted for treason. The next creation was in 1503 for James Hamilton, 2nd Lord Hamilton. His grandson was declared insane in 1562 and the title passed to the king's favourite Captain James Stewart in 1581. In 1609, the second Marquess of Hamilton inherited the earldom. In 1643, the third Marquess was made Duke of Hamilton and received a second grant of the earldom of Arran. At the death of the second Duke, the 1503 earldom became dormant (i.e., it was unclaimed), while the 1643 earldom descended along with the dukedom, with which it is still united. For more information on these creations, see the Duke of Hamilton.

Earls of Arran, first creation (1467)
Thomas Boyd, 1st Earl of Arran (died ) (forfeit 1469)

Earls of Arran, second and third creations (1503, 1643)

Notes

References
Kidd, Charles, Williamson, David (editors). Debrett's Peerage and Baronetage (1990 edition). New York: St Martin's Press, 1990, 

1467 establishments in Scotland
1469 disestablishments in Scotland
Forfeited earldoms in the Peerage of Scotland
Dormant earldoms in the Peerage of Scotland
Noble titles created in 1467
Noble titles created in 1503
Noble titles created in 1581
Noble titles created in 1643